The following is a list of fictional or mythological winged horses.

Mythology
The ancient Pegasus is a mythological winged horse.
The Hippalectryon is a half-horse, half-rooster hybrid depicted in ancient Greek art.
Devadatta is the winged flying white horse of Kalki in Hinduism, bestowed by the god Shiva.
In Islam, Al-Buraq was a mythical steed who carried the prophet Muhammad.
Tianma was a winged 'celestial' horse in Chinese folklore.
 A Qianlima is a mythical winged horse which originates from the Chinese classics.
 In Islamic tradition, Haizum is the horse of the archangel Gabriel.
 Tulpar is a winged or swift horse in Turkic mythology.
 Uchchaihshravas is a white winged horse, described in Hindu scriptures as one of the supernatural beings which emerged from the churning of the ocean of milk.
 The Wind Horse is a winged horse from Tibetan mythology.
 The Ethiopian pegasus was born on an island in the Red Sea off the coast of Eritrea.

See also
List of winged unicorns
List of fictional horses

References

Lists of fictional animals by type